Richard Masters may refer to:

 Richard Masters (football), chief executive of the Premier League
 Richard Master or Masters (died 1588), English physician and personal doctor of Queen Elizabeth I of England
 Richard George Masters (1877–1963), English recipient of the Victoria Cross
 Richard Masters (sailor) (born 1927), Bermudian Olympic sailor
 William Marsters (Richard Masters, 1831–1899), British adventurer
 Richard Masters, American actor who starred in the 1964 film The Starfighters

See also
 Richard Master (governor) (1746–1800), British member of parliament for Cirencester and colonial governor of Tobago
 Richard Masterson, executed in the United States in 2016
Sir Richard Masters Gorham (1917–2006), Bermudian politician